Magna is a genus of moths of the family Erebidae erected by Michael Fibiger in 2008. Its only species, Magna myops, was first described by George Hampson in 1907. It is known from the mountains of Sri Lanka. Records for other countries are misidentifications.

There are multiple generations per year, with adults recorded year round.

The ground colour of the thorax and forewing is dark brown. The crosslines are indistinct, except the terminal line, which is marked by black interveinal dots. The hindwing and fringes are whitish. The underside of the upper part of the forewing is brown, while the lower part of the forewing and hindwing are whitish with a brownish discal spot, a weakly marked terminal line and an incomplete postmedial line.

References

Micronoctuini
Noctuoidea genera
Monotypic moth genera
Moths described in 1907